Alienated land is that which has been acquired from customary landowners by the government, either for its own use or for private development requiring a mortgage or other forms of guarantees. The term refers historically to the appropriation of customary land by European colonial powers. Land was alienated in all colonies.it is set aside to be used for certain projects

See also
Alienation (property law)
Land rights
Aboriginal land claim

Property law
Management cybernetics